On August 13, 2014, ABC Family announced that it has picked up a fourth season of its hit original drama series Switched at Birth, premiering on January 6, 2015. The season is produced by ABC Family, Pirates' Cove Entertainment, and Suzy B Productions, with Paul Stupin and series creator Lizzy Weiss serving as executive producers.

The one-hour scripted drama revolves around two young women who discover they were switched at birth and grew up in very different environments.  While balancing school, jobs, and their unconventional family, the girls, along with their friends and family, experience deaf culture, relationships, class differences, date rape, audism, and other social issues.

Cast

Main
 Sean Berdy as Emmett Bledsoe
 Lucas Grabeel as Toby Kennish
 Katie Leclerc as Daphne Paloma Vasquez
 Vanessa Marano as Bay Madeleine Kennish
 Constance Marie as Regina Vasquez
 D. W. Moffett as John Kennish
 Lea Thompson as Kathryn Kennish

Recurring

Ryan Lane as Travis Barnes
Terrell Tilford as Eric Bishop
Rachel Shenton as Lily Summers
Adam Hagenbuch as Greg "Mingo" Shimingo
Sharon Pierre-Louis as Iris Watkins
Marlee Matlin as Melody Bledsoe
Austin Cauldwell as Josh Padden
Rana Roy as Vimla
Alice Lee as Skye
Max Adler as Miles "Tank" Conroy
Bess Armstrong as Beth Marillo
B.K. Cannon as Mary Beth Tucker
Sarah Stouffer as Tess Ritter
Sayeed Shahidi as Will Bishop
Kim Hawthorne as Hope Paxton
Stephanie Nogueras as Natalie Pierce
Dan J. Johnson as Quinn
Nyle DiMarco as Garrett Banducci
Sean McGowan as Gabe
Shainu Bala as Brandon
Alex Wyse as Howie
Bianca Bethune as Sharee Gifford
Alec Mapa as Renzo
Meredith Baxter as Bonnie Tamblyn-Dixon
Rene Moran as Nacho Rivera
Sam Page as Craig Tebbe
Jill Remez as Juanita

Episodes

Reception

U.S. ratings

References

External links

2015 American television seasons
Switched at Birth (TV series)